"" ("The Nights without Kim Wilde") is a single by Laurent Voulzy about British singer Kim Wilde.

Written by Laurent Voulzy and Alain Souchon, it contains French and English lyrics and was initially released in France in 1985 after Wilde herself agreed to sing backing vocals on it, and was reissued in 1986, coupled with the song "Belle-île-en-mer, Marie Galante", reaching the French Top 20.

An official video was made for the song in which Wilde made an appearance, singing some lyrics in both English and French languages.

References

Kim Wilde songs
1985 songs
Songs written by Laurent Voulzy
Songs written by Alain Souchon
Laurent Voulzy songs